Lenny Young (born December 15, 1963) in Gary, Indiana, is an American film producer. Young collaborated for many years with film producer Jake Eberts where he produced The Education of Little Tree, Grey Owl, Chicken Run and Snow in August.

References

External links
 

Living people
1963 births
People from Gary, Indiana
Film producers from Indiana